The Andrew Bayne Memorial Library is a public library in Bellevue, a suburb of Pittsburgh, Pennsylvania in the United States. The library sits on a four-acre (1.6 ha) parcel of land donated to Bellevue borough in 1912 by the daughters of Allegheny County sheriff Andrew Bayne, and houses approximately 14,000 print volumes.

History
The historic building housing the library collection was once the home of Amanda Bayne Balph, the daughter of Andrew Bayne, the namesake of the library. Andrew Bayne was a member of the Pennsylvania Constitutional Convention of 1837-1838 and Sheriff of Allegheny County in 1838. His daughters, Amanda Balph and Jane Teece, bequeathed the homestead and  surrounding it to Bellevue Borough to be used as a library and park.

Amanda's husband, James Madison Balph, was a prominent architect of Allegheny County, and designed and built the Victorian-style home in 1875. There is a marble fireplace in each room of the house, and James Balph's initials are engraved in the glass transom over the front door. Mrs. Balph, widowed in 1899, lived on in the large white house until her death in August 1912, when it became borough property.

In May 1914, a library committee announced the opening of two rooms in the old home for use as a library. Walkways were laid out, and in 1916, a swimming pool was built in the southernmost part of the park. (The pool has since been removed and a basketball court built in its place.) The upstairs rooms were cleaned and furnished in the early 1920s by a group of women called the Bellevue Federation, who also built tennis courts on the property.

On Memorial Day 1927, the borough formally dedicated the park and library to the citizens of Bellevue.

Today, Andrew Bayne Memorial Library is accompanied by a park. This park has playground equipment for children and a large field that is often used to play football and ultimate frisbee. Next to the field is the Jim Porch Gazebo that is reserved for parties, picnics, and family gatherings. During the summer, the Library hosts movies and concerts on Wednesday evenings. Throughout the year, the Library offers children's activities and various holiday celebrations.

World War I memorial
On 29 May 1920, the Mothers of Democracy dedicated twelve trees in Bayne Park as memorials to "those boys whose lives were given to the cause of our always-loved freedom". On 29 November 1921, a bronze sculpture by Giuseppe Moretti was unveiled on the corner on North Balph and Teece Avenues. The monument is of the soldier as an artisan, a worker, but also a man of heroic courage, "who fought only when needed and then fought well and helped bring home a just and honorable victory". The doughboy is depicted standing with left foot on an anvil, but holding a winged figure representing liberty. They loved peace, but dared to fight".

The "Lone Sentinel"
The "Lone Sentinel" was an elm tree (Ulmus americana) that stood in Bayne Park for approximately 400 years. In 1983, the tree was designated the largest American elm east of the Mississippi River. The tree's crown spread  and reached  in height. The tree had become substantially weakened by Dutch elm disease, and in May 1998, a windstorm tore a large branch, weighing several tons, from the southern side of the tree. The loss of so much of the tree's mass caused the trunk to split, and it had to be taken down in 1998.

Alleged haunting
According to The World's Most Haunted Places by Jeff Belanger, there have been sporadic accounts of a female "ghostly presence" at the Andrew Bayne Memorial Library for decades. The spirit, identified with Amanda Bayne Balph, allegedly began making herself heard especially since the deterioration of the Lone Sentinel elm.

When neither Amanda nor Jane provided heirs to the Bayne property and agreed to turn over their father's land to the borough, they added four stipulations: that the surrounding streets be named "Balph" and "Teece," the mansion be used as a library, the  estate not be developed, and the estate's elm trees not be removed. Throughout the 1900s, all the elm trees perished from Dutch elm disease. Suffering the loss of a large branch in a 1998 windstorm, the Lone Sentinel had to be removed for fear of it falling on nearby buildings. The library director said the ghost "seemed to be very active right around the time that our Lone Sentinel was dying".

Visitors have reported seeing a woman in the window wearing a large hat when the library was closed, and the ghost is also allegedly prone to playing with light switches, ceiling fans, and the library's computers.

Library resources
At the time of the formal dedication, the library contained approximately 3,000 books, some of which were original gifts from the libraries of Mrs. Teece and Mrs. Balph. The first librarian, Mrs. W.R. Newell, issued 954 cards to Bellevue residents. The collection was cataloged and updated in December 1962. The recently renovated building currently houses more than 14,000 titles, several magazine subscriptions, reference materials, and Internet access.

The library is a member of the Access PA statewide library system, and the Allegheny County Library Association.

References

External links

Houses completed in 1875
Public libraries in Pennsylvania
1912 establishments in Pennsylvania
Reportedly haunted locations in Pennsylvania
Libraries in Allegheny County, Pennsylvania
Pittsburgh History & Landmarks Foundation Historic Landmarks
Libraries established in 1912